NGC 6578 is a planetary nebula located  in Sagittarius. It is magnitude 13.5 with diameter 8 arc seconds. It has a 16th magnitude central star, which is an O-type star with a spectral type of Of. It is seen near the star 16 Sagittarii.

See also
 List of NGC objects
 Planetary nebulae

References

 Robert Burnham, Jr, Burnham's Celestial Handbook: An observer's guide to the universe beyond the solar system, vol 3, p. 1557

External links
 
 The Hubble European Space Agency Information Centre Hubble picture and information on NGC 6578
  Hubble December 17, 1997

Planetary nebulae
6578
Sagittarius (constellation)